The 1981 Masters (officially the 1981 Benson & Hedges Masters) was a professional non-ranking snooker tournament that took place from Tuesday 27 January to Sunday 1 February 1981 at the Wembley Conference Centre in London, England. The number of invited players had been raised to 12, which saw Steve Davis make his Masters debut and a rise in prize money. With the increase in the number of players the tournament was extended from 5 days to 6, with a Sunday finish.

Alex Higgins reached his fourth consecutive Masters final by defeating Cliff Thorburn 6–5 in the semi-finals, despite having trailed 1–5. There he reversed the result of the 1980 final against Terry Griffiths, who had himself made a dramatic recovery to beat John Spencer 6–5 in the semi-finals, after trailing 2–5 and needing two snookers in the eighth frame. Griffiths set a new tournament record break of 136 in the final. The tournament attracted 18,742 spectators in its six days, including a new British tournament record of 2,422 for the final session.

Main draw

{{16TeamBracket-Compact-NoSeeds-Byes
| seed-width  =
| team-width  = 180
| score-width =
| RD1=Round 1Best of 9 frames
| RD2=Quarter-finalsBest of 9 frames
| RD3=Semi-finalsBest of 11 frames
| RD4=FinalBest of 17 frames
| RD1-team03=
| RD1-score03=5
| RD1-team04=
| RD1-score04=4
| RD1-team07=
| RD1-score07=2
| RD1-team08=
| RD1-score08=5
| RD1-team11=
| RD1-score11=0
| RD1-team12=
| RD1-score12=5
| RD1-team15=

Final

Century breaks
Total: 2
 136  Terry Griffiths
 102  Cliff Thorburn

References 

Masters (snooker)
Masters
Masters (snooker)
Masters (snooker)
Masters (snooker)